Andre Gianfagna (born 4 December 1987) is an Australian rules football umpire field officiating in the Australian Football League. He was formerly AFL-listed as a player at Melbourne.

He was drafted to Melbourne with pick 51 in the 2006 rookie draft and was delisted at the end of his first season without playing a senior game.

He then captained the Northern Blues in the Victorian Football League, before joining the AFL rookie umpiring list in 2016. He was upgraded to the senior list for the 2018 season, and made his umpiring debut that year.

Controversy 

In 2019 during an AFL Match between the Sydney Swans and Essendon Bombers, Gianfagna failed to award a free kick against Dane Rampe for climbing the goal post. The AFL later deemed the decision correct and in the spirit of the game, albeit against the AFL's rules at the time. The player was later fined for his actions.

References

Living people
Australian rules footballers from Victoria (Australia)
Northern Knights players
Preston Football Club (VFA) players
Australian Football League umpires
1987 births